John Henry Birtles (1874 in Moseley – 4 February 1935 in Moseley) was a British rugby union player who competed in the 1900 Summer Olympics. He was a member of the British rugby union team, which won the silver medal.

References

External links

 J. Henry Birtles' profile at databaseOlympics

1874 births
1935 deaths
British rugby union players
Rugby union players at the 1900 Summer Olympics
Olympic rugby union players of Great Britain
Olympic silver medallists for Great Britain
Medalists at the 1900 Summer Olympics
People from Moseley
Sportspeople from the West Midlands (county)